Schmid is a German surname that is a cognate of "Smith", an occupational surname for a blacksmith. The spelling is more common in Switzerland than Schmidt or Schmitt. Notable people with the surname include:

 Akira Schmid, Swiss ice hockey player
 Alex P. Schmid, Dutch scientist on terror
 Andy Schmid, Swiss handballer
 Anton Schmid, Austrian righteous among nations
 Barbara Schmid-Federer (b.1965), Swiss politician
 Bernhard Schmid (1788–1857), German missionary and botanist
 Carlo Schmid (German politician) (1896–1979), German politician
 Carlo Schmid (Swiss pilot), Swiss pilot
 Carlo Schmid-Sutter (born 1950), Swiss politician
 Charles Schmid (1942–1975), American serial killer
 Christopher Schmid, German musician
 Elisabeth Schmid (1912–1994), German archaeologist
 Engelbert Schmid, German musician
 Erich Schmid (1907–2000), Swiss conductor
 Daniel Schmid (1941–2006), Swiss film director
 Daniel Schmid (bobsledder) (born 1976), Swiss bobsledder
 Flavio Schmid (born 1980), Swiss soccer player
 Fritz Schmid (singer) (born 1972), Austrian singer
 Fritz Schmid (football manager) Swiss football manager
 Hans-Christian Schmid (born 1965), German film director
 Harald Schmid (born 1957), German athlete
 Heinrich Schmid (1921–1999), Swiss linguist
 Hellmut Schmid (1915–1998), Swiss geodetic scientist
 Herbert Schmid (born 1914), German pilot who defected to Scotland
 Jeanette Schmid (1924–2005), German-Czech performer
 John Schmid (born 1949), American country and folk singer
 Josef Schmid (composer) (1890–1969), German composer
 Josef Schmid (athlete) (born 1953), West German middle distance runner
 Josef Schmid (flight surgeon), NASA flight surgeon
 Joseph Schmid (1901–1956), German WWII Luftwaffe general
 Kristian Schmid (born 1974), Australian actor
 Kyle Schmid (born 1984), Canadian actor
 Lothar Schmid (1928–2013), German chess grandmaster
 Nils Schmid (born 1973), German politician
 Olaf Schmid (born 1979), UK bomb disposal officer
 Peter Schmid (1898–?), Swiss olympic skier
 Peter Schmid (archaeologist) (1926–2022), German archaeologist
 Peter Schmid (swimmer) (born 1949), Austrian swimmer
 Richard Schmid (1934–2021), American artist
 Rudolf Schmid (bishop) (1914–2012), German bishop
 Samuel Schmid (born 1948), Swiss politician
 Sandra Schmid (born 1958), Canadian cell biologist
 Sigi Schmid (born 1953), American soccer coach
 Walter Schmid (born 1944), Swiss entrepreneur
 Wilhelm Schmid (scholar) (1859-1951), German classical scholar

See also 
 
 F.X. Schmid
 Schmied
 Schmidt (disambiguation)
 Schmitt (disambiguation)
 Schmitz

German-language surnames
Occupational surnames